Kim Myong-gyu (born 20 June 1953) is a North Korean judoka. He competed in the men's heavyweight event at the 1980 Summer Olympics.

References

1953 births
Living people
North Korean male judoka
Olympic judoka of North Korea
Judoka at the 1980 Summer Olympics
Place of birth missing (living people)